Same-sex marriage in Wisconsin has been legally recognized since October 6, 2014, upon the resolution of a lawsuit challenging the state's ban on same-sex marriage. On October 6, the U.S. Supreme Court refused to hear an appeal of an appellate court ruling in Wolf v. Walker that had found Wisconsin's ban on same-sex marriage unconstitutional. The appellate court issued its order prohibiting enforcement of the state's ban on same-sex marriage the next day and Wisconsin counties began issuing marriage licenses to same-sex couples immediately. Wisconsin had previously recognized domestic partnerships, which afforded limited legal rights to same-sex couples, from August 2009 until they were discontinued in April 2018.

The Constitution of Wisconsin had precluded state recognition of same-sex marriages and prohibited the establishment of any similar legal status under another name since 2006, when 59% of voters ratified a constitutional amendment defining marriage so as to exclude same-sex couples. A federal lawsuit filed in February 2014, Wolf v. Walker, challenged Wisconsin's refusal to grant marriage licenses to same-sex couples, its refusal to recognize same-sex marriages established in other jurisdictions, and related statutes. In June 2014, Judge Barbara Brandriff Crabb of the U.S. District Court for the Western District of Wisconsin ruled for the plaintiffs and in the week before she stayed her decision county clerks in 60 of the state's 72 counties issued marriage licenses to same-sex couples and some performed marriage ceremonies for them. The state appealed her decision to the Seventh Circuit Court of Appeals, which affirmed her decision on September 4 and later stayed implementation of its ruling until the U.S. Supreme Court decided whether to consider the case.

Public opinion polls since voters adopted the constitutional amendment in 2006 have reported a trend in favor of the legal recognition of same-sex relationships, with a 2022 poll showing that 72% of Wisconsin residents supported same-sex marriage.

Domestic partnerships

Domestic partnerships in Wisconsin afforded limited rights to same-sex couples. They were legalized in the state on August 3, 2009, but were discontinued on April 1, 2018 following the legalization of same-sex marriage. Domestic partnerships in Wisconsin provided select rights, such as the ability to inherit a partner's estate in the absence of a will, hospital and jail visitation, and the ability to access family medical leave to care for a sick partner.

By June 2017, about 4,400 couples had registered a domestic partnership in Wisconsin, with 78% of these being opposite-sex couples.

Same-sex marriage ban

Statutes
Legislation that the Family Research Institute (FRI) called a "statutory endorsement of traditional marriage" was proposed in the Wisconsin Legislature in 1997. It passed the Assembly on a 78–20 vote, but the Senate took no action on the measure before it adjourned. Legislation in support of same-sex marriage was also proposed that year, but was not voted on by either chamber.

A bill banning same-sex marriage was introduced in the Assembly on August 17, 2003, and approved on a vote of 68–29 on October 23. The Senate passed the bill by a vote of 22–10 on November 5. Governor Jim Doyle vetoed the legislation on November 10. The Assembly failed to override Doyle's veto by one vote, 63–33, on November 12.

Wisconsin also has a marriage evasion law, which established criminal penalties of up to nine months' imprisonment and a fine up to $10,000 for leaving the state to contract a marriage that would not be valid in the state. According to a spokesperson for Lambda Legal in 2008, several states had similar laws, but Wisconsin's provided the harshest penalties. The applicability of the law to same-sex marriages was disputed, since it was designed to prevent fraud on the part of someone too young to marry legally in Wisconsin.

Constitution
On March 5, 2004, the Assembly approved a state constitutional amendment by a vote of 68–27, that read: Only a marriage between one man and one woman shall be valid or recognized as a marriage in this state. A legal status identical or substantially similar to that of marriage for unmarried individuals shall not be valid or recognized in this state.
The Senate approved the same language by a 20–13 vote on March 12, completing the first of two legislative approvals required to place the amendment on the ballot. The Senate approved the proposed amendment again on December 6, 2005, voting 19–14 along party lines. The Assembly did the same on February 28, 2006, by a vote of 62–31. The question appeared as a referendum on the statewide ballot for the 2006 general election on November 7, 2006, and voters approved the amendment by a margin of 59.4% to 40.6%.

Lawsuits

State cases

McConkey v. Van Hollen
William McConkey, a political science instructor filed a lawsuit, McConkey v. Van Hollen, on April 9, 2009, with the Wisconsin Supreme Court, charging that the 2006 referendum which banned both same-sex marriage and civil unions in the state, violated the State Constitution because it proposed more than one question in a single ballot proposal, which is illegal under Wisconsin law. On May 14, the court agreed to hear the case, specifying two questions, whether McConkey, as an individual voter, had standing to sue and whether the ballot initiative presented two questions. Wisconsin Attorney General J. B. Van Hollen challenged McConkey's standing. The court heard oral arguments on November 3. On June 30, 2010, the Wisconsin Supreme Court ruled 7–0 in McConkey that the ballot measure was proper.

Halopka-Ivery v. Walker
On April 16, 2014, a lesbian couple married in California sought original jurisdiction in the Wisconsin Supreme Court. They claimed the state's "parallel civil marriage and domestic partnership structure" denied them access to federal benefits. They also challenged Wisconsin's statute imposing criminal penalties on residents who contract in other jurisdictions a marriage that is not recognized by the state. On May 27, 2014, the Wisconsin Supreme Court, on a 5–2 vote, declined to hear the case.

Federal cases

Burkett v. Zablocki
In 1971, Donna Burkett and Manonia Evans, an African American lesbian couple from Milwaukee, filed a lawsuit in the U.S. District Court for the Eastern District of Wisconsin against the Milwaukee County Clerk, Thomas Zablocki, for refusing to issue them a marriage license. The couple sought "an order compelling the clerk of Milwaukee County to issue them an application for a marriage license." Zablocki moved to dismiss the suit. The plaintiffs failed to submit timely briefs in response to the clerk's motion, and the court dismissed the case in 1972.

Wolf v. Walker

On February 3, 2014, the American Civil Liberties Union (ACLU) and the law firm Mayer Brown filed a lawsuit in the U.S. District Court for the Western District of Wisconsin on behalf of four same-sex couples, including a lesbian couple married in Minnesota in 2013. It challenged the State Constitution's denial of marriage rights to same-sex couples and the state statute that provided criminal penalties for leaving the state to establish a marriage that was not valid in Wisconsin. The suit named Governor Scott Walker, several state officials, and two county clerks as defendants. The case was assigned to U.S. District Judge Barbara Brandriff Crabb, who ruled on June 6, 2014 that the state's constitutional and statutory restrictions on same-sex marriage interfere with the fundamental right to marry, violating the Due Process Clause of the Constitution of the United States, and discriminate on the basis of sexual orientation, violating the Equal Protection Clause. In response to the decision, though Crabb had yet to issue any order enforcing it, county clerks in increasing numbers began issuing marriage licenses to same-sex couples and in some cases performing marriage ceremonies for them. Renee Currie and Shari Roll were the first couple to be issued a license in Madison, and were married minutes later just a few blocks away from the Wisconsin State Capitol. The Milwaukee County Executive, Chris Abele, said he would keep the courthouse open until 9 p.m. so same-sex couples could be issued marriage licenses. On June 13, after a week of legal maneuvering and a threat of legal action against the clerks on the part of Wisconsin Attorney General J. B. Van Hollen, Crabb stayed enforcement of her decision while expressing disappointment that recent action by the U.S. Supreme Court in the Utah case of Kitchen v. Herbert compelled her to do so.

On July 10, the state appealed the decision to the Seventh Circuit Court of Appeals, which combined the case for briefing with a similar Indiana case, Baskin v. Bogan, and scheduled oral arguments for August 26. On September 4, the Seventh Circuit, in a unanimous opinion authored by Judge Richard Posner, upheld the district court decision. Posner wrote:
 On September 9, Van Hollen asked the U.S. Supreme Court to consider the case. The Seventh Circuit stayed enforcement of its ruling on September 18. On October 6, 2014, the U.S. Supreme Court denied review of this case, allowing the Seventh Circuit's ruling to take effect. Attorney General Van Hollen responded by stating, "the Seventh Circuit affirmed the District Court's decision holding Wisconsin's Marriage Protection Amendment unconstitutional, and the Supreme Court has declined the opportunity to examine that decision. It is now our obligation to comply with those court decisions." Governor Walker also instructed county clerks to comply and issue marriage licenses to same-sex couples. Same-sex couples began marrying in Wisconsin the following day, Tuesday October 7, 2014, after the Seventh Circuit and the District Court issued their mandates.

Obergefell v. Hodges
On June 26, 2015, the U.S. Supreme Court ruled 5–4 in Obergefell v. Hodges that state bans on same-sex marriage violate the Fourteenth Amendment, thus invalidating all remaining state same-sex marriage bans in the United States. Governor Walker said the ruling was a "grave mistake" and called for a federal constitutional amendment banning same-sex marriage, "The only alternative left for the American people is to support an amendment to the U.S. Constitution to reaffirm the ability of the states to continue to define marriage." Jerome E. Listecki, the Archbishop of Milwaukee, called it "a sad day for the sacrament of marriage". Karen Gotzler, the executive director of the Milwaukee LGBT Community Center, welcomed the court decision, "It's really a joyous day for us." Joseph Czarnezki, the Milwaukee County Clerk, said "We're expecting an influx of people, same-sex couples, who desire to get married. I've talked to people in the community who said they are specifically waiting for the Supreme Court ruling so that their marriage would be legal in all 50 states."

Native American nations
Same-sex marriage is legal on the reservations of the Ho-Chunk Nation of Wisconsin, which legalized same-sex marriage when the Ho-Chunk Nation Legislature voted 13–0 on June 5, 2017 to approve a bill allowing same-sex couples to marry, the Lac du Flambeau Band of Lake Superior Chippewa, where state law governs marriage relations, the Menominee Indian Tribe of Wisconsin, the Oneida Nation of Wisconsin, which legalized on June 10, 2015, and the Stockbridge–Munsee Community, which legalized on February 22, 2016. The Menominee Tribal Council voted 6–0 on November 3, 2016 to legalize same-sex marriage. The Tribal Code now reads "'Marriage' is a civil contract between two (2) persons, regardless of their sex, creating a union to the exclusion of all others." The tribal Licensing and Permit Department will issue a marriage license "upon receiving a completed application form from two unmarried persons, regardless of sex (or gender), and in the absence of any showing that the proposed marriage would be invalid under any provisions of this code."

The Ho-Chunk people have traditionally recognized two-spirit people who were born male but wore women's clothing and performed everyday household work and artistic handiwork which were regarded as belonging to the feminine sphere. They were believed to have been blessed by the spirit of the Moon, and were "holy and highly respected for special gifts such as prophesy, healing, artistry, and excelling at women's tasks". Many teją́čowįga married cisgender men, without indication of polygyny. This two-spirit status thus allowed for marriages between two biological males to be performed in the tribe. Many agokwe were wives in polygnyous households.

Demographics and marriage statistics
Data from the 2000 U.S. census showed that 8,232 same-sex couples were living in Wisconsin. By 2005, this had increased to 14,894 couples, likely attributed to same-sex couples' growing willingness to disclose their partnerships on government surveys. Same-sex couples lived in all counties of the state, and constituted 0.7% of coupled households and 0.4% of all households in the state. Most couples lived in Milwaukee, Dane and Waukesha counties, but the counties with the highest percentage of same-sex couples were Dane (0.80% of all county households) and Sawyer (0.78%). Same-sex partners in Wisconsin were on average younger than opposite-sex partners, and more likely to be employed. However, the average and median household incomes of same-sex couples were lower than different-sex couples, and same-sex couples were also far less likely to own a home than opposite-sex partners. 16% of same-sex couples in Wisconsin were raising children under the age of 18, with an estimated 3,783 children living in households headed by same-sex couples in 2005.

Public opinion

See also
LGBT rights in Wisconsin
Domestic partnerships in Wisconsin
Same-sex marriage in the United States

Notes

References

External links
 Wolf v. Walker, United States District Court for the Western District of Wisconsin, June 6, 2014: Opinion and Order

2014 in LGBT history
LGBT in Wisconsin
Wisconsin
2014 in Wisconsin